Lake Monginup also known as Lake Mongingup and Lake Mortijinup is a freshwater lake in the Goldfields-Esperance region of Western Australia.

Description
The reserve is managed by the Lake Monjingup Development Committee, which received a $32,000 Lotterywest grant in 2008 to improve facilities, manage dieback and introduce native mammals back into the area.

The area is an excellent example of undisturbed natural vegetation in the area and includes a specimen of Macrozamia dyeri that is over 1,000 years old.

The area was once used as a motorcycle track, a market garden and a watering hole for stockmen's horses.
In 1983 a group of concerned locals started a campaign to preserve the area.

The area is home to 90 species of birds, 18 species of lizard and 9 species of frogs as well as honey possums, echidnas and western grey kangaroos.

See also

 List of lakes of Western Australia

References 

Monginup